Johnson Township is one of thirty-seven townships in Washington County, Arkansas, USA. As of the 2000 census, its total population was 3,076.

Geography

Cities, towns, villages
Gulley
Johnson

Cemeteries
The township contains Stuckey Cemetery.

Major routes
  Interstate 540/US 71/US 62
  Arkansas Highway 112

References

 United States National Atlas

External links
 US-Counties.com
 City-Data.com

Townships in Washington County, Arkansas
Townships in Arkansas